The Dial Range is a small mountain range in northwest Tasmania, south of the town of Penguin near the coast. It is bordered on the east and south by the Leven River, with the Gunns Plains to the south.

Of this,  is state forest and forest reserve managed by Forestry Tasmania. Two smaller areas are managed by the Parks and Wildlife Service, the Mount Montgomery and Ferndene state reserves. The remaining , comprising two land parcels contiguous with the reserves, have been proposed as a Nature Recreation Area.

The Dial Range is close to the small town of Penguin.

Mountains in the range, from north to south, are:
 Mount Montgomery
 Mount Dial
 Mount Gnomon
 Mount Duncan
 Mount Riana
 Mount Lorymer

Notes

External links
 Dial Range Recreation Management Plan; June 2000; Inspiring Place Consultants and Office of Sport and Recreation Tasmania.
 https://web.archive.org/web/20091004005023/http://www.forestrytas.com.au/visiting/visitor-sites/north-west/dial-range

Mountain ranges of Tasmania
North West Coast of Tasmania